The 2018–19 Women's Hockey Series Open was an international field hockey competition held from June to December 2018.

Salamanca

Pool

All times are local (UTC−6).

Results

Singapore

All times are local (UTC+8).

Pool

Results

Fifth place game

Third place game

Final

Final ranking

Wattignies

Pool

All times are local (UTC+2).

Results

Port Vila

Matches were played in a Hockey5s format.

Pool

All times are local (UTC+11).

Results

Third place game

Final

Final ranking

Vilnius

Pool

Results

The game was stopped after 40 minutes due to heavy rain and continued on 09:30 the next day.

Santiago

Pool

All times are local (UTC−4).

Results

Bulawayo

Pool

All times are local (UTC+2).

Results

References

Open